Oenopota quadra is a species of sea snail, a marine gastropod mollusk in the family Mangeliidae.

Description
The length of the shell attains 8 mm, its diameter 4.5 mm.

(Original description) The short and stout shell is white. It contains about five whorls. The apex is eroded. The suture is distinct,. The anal fasciole is narrow, excavated, and finely spirally striated. The axial sculpture consists of (on the body whorl about 18) stout nearly vertical ribs angulated at the edge of the fasciole, forming a narrow shoulder, but without a limiting cord, with usually narrower interspaces and obsolete on the base. The incremental lines are not conspicuous. The spiral sculpture consists of spiral grooves with much wider flat interspaces. The siphonal canal is constricted, spirally threaded and very short. The aperture is simple. The inner lip is erased.

Distribution
This marine species occurs from the Aleutian Islands to Puget Sound.

References

External links
  Tucker, J.K. 2004 Catalog of recent and fossil turrids (Mollusca: Gastropoda). Zootaxa 682:1–1295.
 

quadra
Gastropods described in 1919